NGC 3486 is an intermediate barred spiral galaxy located about 27.4 million light years away in the constellation of Leo Minor. It has a morphological classification of SAB(r)c, which indicates it is a weakly barred spiral with an inner ring and loosely wound arms. This is a borderline, low-luminosity Seyfert galaxy with an active nucleus. However, no radio or X-ray emission has been detected from the core, and it may only have a small supermassive black hole with less than a million times the mass of the Sun.

References

External links
 
 

Leo Minor
3486
Intermediate spiral galaxies
17850411